PMR Engineering College is one of the self-financing engineering colleges Affiliated to Anna University in Tamil Nadu started in the year 2008." It is located in Vanagaram, next to Maduravoyil. It is approved by All India Council for Technical Education. It was founded by P.Muthuvelraj, Chairman.

Controversies

On 9 February 2009, students of PMR Institute of Technology boycott the college and went down for a strike stating that infrastructure was not proper.
CMDA had listed the PMR engineering college property for Locking/Sealing/Demolition due to various reasons.

Reference: http://www.cmdachennai.gov.in/LSDNoticeIssued.html (Prior to 2018) file number: EN3/7148/10
PMR Engineering college now stands at the same place where "PMR Institute of Technology" was running until few years back but was shown its shutters by the University/AICTE.

References

External links
 Website

Engineering colleges in Chennai
Colleges affiliated to Anna University
Educational institutions established in 1999
1999 establishments in Tamil Nadu